For 1988 in television, see:

1988 in American television
1988 in Australian television
1988 in Austrian television
1988 in Belgian television
1988 in Brazilian television
1988 in British television
1988 in Canadian television
1988 in Czech television
1988 in Danish television
1988 in Dutch television
1988 in German television
1988 in Irish television
1988 in Israeli television
1988 in Italian television
1988 in Japanese television
1988 in New Zealand television
1988 in Norwegian television
1988 in Philippine television
1988 in Portuguese television
1988 in Scottish television
1988 in Singapore television
1988 in South African television
1988 in Swedish television